Al From (born May 31, 1943) is the founder and former CEO of the Democratic Leadership Council. His ideas and political strategies during the past quarter century played a central role in the resurgence of the modern Democratic Party. From is the author of The New Democrats and the Return to Power, released in December 2013.

Early life and education 
Born in South Bend, Indiana, From earned a master's degree in journalism from Northwestern University and was editor of the Daily Northwestern.

While serving as a reporter and editor for the Daily Northwestern, From conducted an investigation on discriminatory admissions. From, who was Jewish, uncovered an unofficial quota system that limited the number of minority students admitted to the program. According to the magazine North by Northwestern, From quoted admissions director, C. William Reiley, "making discriminatory statements and the day after the story was published, the student senate stated that Reiley's actions were inappropriate. Reiley was later reassigned as the dean of administrative services." The removal of Reiley and exposure of the quotas ended the discriminatory practice.

Career 
In 2000, at a speech at Hyde Park, President Bill Clinton said, "It would be hard to think of a single American citizen who, as a private citizen, has had a more positive impact on the progress of American life in the last 25 years than Al From."

Early career 
From began his career working for Sargent Shriver's War on Poverty right out of graduate school, assigned to the Southeast region including Alabama, Mississippi and Georgia.

Before founding the DLC, From was executive director of the House Democratic Caucus from 1981 to 1985, chaired by Representative Gillis William Long from Louisiana. For two years—1979 and 1980—he was deputy advisor on inflation to President Jimmy Carter and from 1971 to 1979, he directed the U.S. Senate Subcommittee on Intergovernmental Relations, chaired by Senator Edmund Muskie. As staff director, he worked on the Congressional Budget Act, helped shape the stimulus package during the 1973-74 recession and was called a "legislative genius" by Washingtonian magazine.

The Democratic Leadership Council 
From led the DLC from its inception in 1985 until he stepped down as CEO in April 2009.

He founded the DLC in 1985, at a time as Roll Call writes, "Democrats appeared to be on the brink of a permanent excursion into the political wild following Walter Mondale's 49-state drubbing by incumbent President Ronald Reagan in 1984."

In 1991, the Reverend Jesse Jackson called the DLC "Democrats for the Leisure Class", and in 2003, former Democratic National Committee Chair and Vermont Governor Howard Dean sharply criticized From and the DLC as the Republican wing of the Democratic Party.

From played a prominent role in the 1992 election of President Bill Clinton – and served as domestic policy advisor to the Clinton Transition – prompting USA Today to write: "The ideas at the crux of the Clinton candidacy were largely drafted by the DLC."

Today, many of the ideas that comprise the core of the agenda of the Democratic Party's conservative wing come from work done under From's leadership at the DLC. National service, an expanded Earned Income Tax Credit, welfare reform, charter schools, community policing, expanded trade and re-inventing government were all championed by scholars and analysts at the DLC before becoming public policy.

In 1998, with First Lady Hillary Clinton, From began a dialogue with British Prime Minister Tony Blair and other world leaders, and the DLC brand – known as The Third Way – became a model for resurgent liberal governments around the globe.

In April 1999, he hosted a Third Way forum in Washington with President Clinton, Prime Minister Blair, German Chancellor Gerhard Schroeder, Prime Ministers Wim Kok of the Netherlands and Massimo D'Alema of Italy.

In November 1999, joining President Clinton, From moderated the first-ever live presidential town hall meeting on the Internet.

Recent work 
In 2013, From authored The New Democrats and the Return to Power. President Bill Clinton authored the foreword. In the book, From "outlines for the first time the principles at the heart of the [New Democrat] movement… and why they are vital to the success of the Democratic Party in the years ahead." The book received praise from President Clinton, former British Prime Minister Tony Blair, and Chicago Mayor Rahm Emanuel, who said, "it should be read, re-read and underlined by anyone who wants to know what it takes to be successful in American politics today."

From is currently an adjunct faculty member at Johns Hopkins University in the Krieger School of Arts & Sciences, Advanced Academic Programs. His new venture, the From Company, LLC, offers strategic advice to private clients.

From serves on the Board of Advisors of the Medill School of Journalism at Northwestern University, the Board of Directors of the U.S. Chamber of Commerce National Chamber Foundation, the Board of Trustees of the Annapolis Symphony Orchestra, the National Advisory Board of the Roosevelt Institution, and the Executive Board of the University of Maryland's Center for American Politics and Citizenship. He was appointed to the U.S. Naval Academy Board of Visitors in 1999, and served as chairman until December 2002 when his term expired.  His writings have appeared in numerous national publications, including The Wall Street Journal, The Washington Post, The New York Times, Los Angeles Times, The Chicago Tribune, The Atlantic, U.S. News & World Report, and Politico.

Personal life 
From lives in Annapolis, Maryland, with his wife, Ginger.

References

External links
 Al From's page on The Democratic Leadership Council website

1943 births
Living people
Medill School of Journalism alumni
Writers from South Bend, Indiana
Indiana Democrats